Garry Gerard Paul Herbert  (b. 3 October 1969) is an Olympic gold medal-winning cox. He steered the British coxed pair (brothers Jonny and Greg Searle) to victory in the 1992 Barcelona Olympics (the last time this event was included in the Olympic rowing programme) and the 1993 World Rowing Championships.

His tears of emotion at the medal presentation, with the taller Searle brothers smiling behind him, became an iconic image in Britain.

Born in London, he studied there at Cardinal Vaughan Memorial School, and at the University of Reading, then trained as a barrister. He is now a banker and a commentator for the BBC as well as a motivational speaker. During the 2012 Summer Olympics torch relay, he was chosen to cox the boat carrying Steve Redgrave holding the Torch down the River Thames at Henley.

References

1969 births
People from Lewisham
English male rowers
British male rowers
British motivational speakers
Coxswains (rowing)
Sports commentators
English Olympic medallists
Olympic gold medallists for Great Britain
Rowers at the 1992 Summer Olympics
Rowers at the 1996 Summer Olympics
Living people
Members of the Order of the British Empire
Olympic medalists in rowing
People educated at Cardinal Vaughan Memorial School
Medalists at the 1992 Summer Olympics
World Rowing Championships medalists for Great Britain